JRZ may refer to:
 Benito Juárez Airport, Argentina
 , a Swiss charity programme
 Yugoslav Radical Union, a political party in the Kingdom of Yugoslavia